Pohorniceni is a village in Orhei District, Moldova.

References

Villages of Orhei District